Queen Lane station is a SEPTA Regional Rail station in Philadelphia, Pennsylvania. Located at 5319 Wissahickon Avenue facing West Queen Lane, it serves the Chestnut Hill West Line.

The station is 7.4 track miles from Suburban Station. In 2004, this station saw 470 boardings on an average weekday. It was built for the Philadelphia, Germantown & Chestnut Hill Railroad, a subsidiary of the Pennsylvania Railroad, in 1885 to a design by Washington Bleddyn Powell.

Station layout

References

External links
SEPTA - Queen Lane Station
 Station House from Google Maps Street View

SEPTA Regional Rail stations
Former Pennsylvania Railroad stations
Railway stations in Philadelphia